La Tasha Taylor is an American blues and soul vocalist, songwriter, and actress.  For the international baton-twirling champion, see Tasha Nicole Taylor.

Early life and education 
Born and raised in Dallas, Texas, Taylor is the daughter of American soul and rhythm and blues vocalist Johnnie Taylor. She attended Boston University.

Career 
She was guest vocalist on Tommy Castro’s album, The Devil You Know. As an actress, she has been featured in episodes of Moesha, House and Ugly Betty, and the indie films, Dimples and Heaven Ain’t Hard to Find. As a composer, her original music has been featured on the television programs Men in Trees and Lipstick Jungle.  In 2016, Taylor toured the United States as a featured artist with Ruf's "Blues Caravan", alongside Layla Zoe and Ina Forsman. The resultant live album, Blues Caravan 2016, ensued.

Filmography

Film

Television

References

External links
Official website (2014)

Year of birth missing (living people)
Living people
American blues singers
American women singers
American soul singers
American stage actresses
American television actresses
American voice actresses
Singer-songwriters from Texas
21st-century American women